Mesosa angusta is a species of beetle in the family Cerambycidae. It was described by Gressitt in 1951. It is known from China.

References

angusta
Beetles described in 1951